Osagie (also spelled Osaghae, Osaghie, Osaghee and Osaje) is both a family name and masculine given name of Nigerian origin. It is used by the Edo and means godsent.

People
Abubakar Bello-Osagie (born 1988), Nigerian footballer playing in Malta
Andrew Osagie (born 1988), British middle-distance runner
Bright Edomwonyi (born 1994), Nigerian footballer playing in Austria
Francis Edo-Osagie (born 1914), Nigerian timber businessman
Godwin Osagie Abbe (born 1949), Nigerian politician and Defence Minister
Hakeem Bello-Osagie (born c. 1945), Nigerian petroleum businessman
Junior Osagie (born 1985), Nigerian footballer playing in Israel
Osagie Alegimenlen, Corporate Management, businessman
Eghosa E. Osaghae, Nigerian politics academic and vice-chancellor of Igbinedion University
Omo Osaghae (born 1988), American hurdler

References

Nigerian names
Masculine given names